St Martin's  is a civil parish in Shropshire, England.  It contains 22 listed buildings that are recorded in the National Heritage List for England.  Of these, one is listed at Grade I, the highest of the three grades, and the others are at Grade II, the lowest grade.  The parish contains the village of St Martin's and smaller settlements, and is otherwise rural.  Most of the listed buildings are farmhouses, farm buildings, houses and associated structures.  The other listed buildings include a church, a sundial in the churchyard, two bridges, two lodges, a war memorial, and an animal pound.


Key

Buildings

References

Citations

Sources

 

Lists of buildings and structures in Shropshire